The 2009 Ballon d'Or, given to the best football player in the world as judged by an international panel of sports journalists, was awarded to Lionel Messi of Barcelona on 1 December 2009.

Messi won the award by a then record margin, 240 points ahead of 2008 winner Cristiano Ronaldo. Xavi was the second Barcelona player in the top three, finishing a further 63 points behind Ronaldo. Messi's win made him the first Argentine-born player to win the award since Omar Sívori in 1961; however, Sívori had taken Italian citizenship by that time and is recognised to have won the Ballon d'Or as an Italian player.

Rankings

References

External links
 France Football Official Ballon d'Or page

2009
2009–10 in European football